Julie Buffalohead (born 1972) is a contemporary Indigenous American artist. Her work mainly focuses on themes of racial injustice, indigenous rights, and abuse of power.

Early life and education
Buffalohead was born in Minnesota in 1972, and is an enrolled member of Ponca Tribe of Indians of Oklahoma. In 1995, she received her Bachelor in Fine Arts from the Minneapolis College of Art and Design before going on to get her Master of Fine Arts from Cornell University in 2001. Buffalohead has stated that her time working with elementary school students while in graduate school caused her to change the way she looked at her Native heritage, spurning her to create art portraying Native stories and myths. She currently resides in St. Paul, Minnesota.

Artistic style and influences 
Buffalohead's art focuses on Indigenous experiences and stories, often subverting imagery of Native people used in popular culture, including Disney's Pocahontas. She often uses metaphors and allegorical images in her work to critique issues within modern society such as gun violence. While her work often includes imagery such as tea parties, and children's cartoon characters, Buffalohead has said that the work is intended to be unsettling. Buffalohead's work also incorporates the use of anthropomorphic animals, mainly coyotes. Buffalohead is a mixed media artist, and works in many different mediums, including oil paints, birch bark, porcupine quills, and printmaking.

Solo exhibitions 

 2000 - Offerings From the Heart at Carl N. Gorman Museum in Davis, CA.
 2003 - Alice P. Rogers Gallery at St. Johns University in Collegeville, MN.
 2008 - Expecting at the Bockley Gallery in Minneapolis, MN.
 2010 - Julie Buffalohead at the Bockley Gallery in Minneapolis, MN.
 2012 - Julie Buffalohead at the Bockley Gallery in Minneapolis, MN.
 2012 - Julie Buffalohead, Let the Show Begin at the Smithsonian National Museum of the American Indian George Gustave Haye Center in New York, NY. 
 2014 - Julie Buffalohead: Uncommon Stories at the Bockley Gallery in Minneapolis, MN.
 2014-2015 - Julie Buffalohead: Coyote Dreams at the Minnesota Museum of American Art in St. Paul, MN and the Plains Art Museum in Fargo, ND.
 2015 - The Truth About Stories: Julie Buffalohead at Institute of American Indian Arts in Santa Fe, NM.
 2015-2016 - Entwined: New Prints by Julie Buffalohead at Highpoint Center for Printmaking in Minneapolis, MN.
 2017 - Julie Buffalohead at the Bockley Gallery in Minneapolis, MN.
 2018 - Julie Buffalohead: You and I at Western Carolina University Fine Art Museum, John W. Bardo Fine and Performing Arts Center in Cullowhee, NC.
 2018-2019 - Eyes On: Julie Buffalohead at the Denver Art Museum in Denver, CO.

Group exhibitions 

 2019 - Hearts of Our People: Native Women Artists at Minneapolis Institute of Art in Minneapolis, MN.
 2020 - Indelible Ink: Native Women, Printmaking, Collaboration. University of New Mexico Art Museum in Albuquerque, NM.
 2021 - Shared Ideologies at the Muscarelle Museum of Art in Williamsburg, VA.

Honors and awards 
Buffalohead has been the recipient of several awards, including the McKnight Foundation Fellowship for Visual Arts, a Jerome Foundation Travel and Study Grant, and the Minnesota State Arts Board for Visual Artists.

Collections
Her work is included in the collection of the Walker Art Museum and the Muscarelle Museum of Art.

References 

Native American artists
1972 births
Living people
Minneapolis College of Art and Design alumni
Cornell University alumni
American women artists
21st-century American women
20th-century Native American women
20th-century Native Americans
21st-century Native American women
21st-century Native Americans